Alexander, Crown Prince of Yugoslavia (born 17 July 1945 in London), is the head of the House of Karađorđević, the former royal house of the defunct Kingdom of Yugoslavia and its predecessor the Kingdom of Serbia. Alexander is the only child of King Peter II and his wife, Princess Alexandra of Greece and Denmark. He held the position of crown prince in the Democratic Federal Yugoslavia for the first four-and-a-half months of his life, from his birth until the declaration of the Federal People's Republic of Yugoslavia later in 1945. In public he claims the crowned royal title of "Alexander II Karađorđević" ( / Aleksandar II Karađorđević) The monarchy was subsequently abolished in November 1945 when Yugoslavia was renamed the Federal People's Republic of Yugoslavia, when a communist government was established.

Born and raised in the United Kingdom, he enjoys close relationships with his relatives in the British royal family. His godparents were King George VI of the United Kingdom and his daughter, the then-Princess Elizabeth (later Queen Elizabeth II). Through his father, Alexander is a direct descendant of Queen Victoria, through his great-great-grandfather Prince Alfred, Duke of Saxe-Coburg and Gotha, Victoria's second eldest son. Maternally, he is also a direct descendant of Queen Victoria, through his great-great-grandmother Victoria, Empress of Germany, Victoria's eldest daughter. Alexander is known for his support of monarchism and his humanitarian work.

Status at birth
As with many other European monarchs during World War II, King Peter II left his country to establish a government-in-exile. He left Yugoslavia in April 1941 and arrived in London in June 1941. The Royal Yugoslav Armed Forces capitulated in 18 April.

After the Tehran Conference, the Allies shifted support from royalist Chetniks to communist-led Partisans. Commenting on the event and what happened to his father, Crown Prince Alexander said, "He [Peter II] was too straight. He could not believe that his allies – the mighty American democracy and his relatives and friends in London – could do him in. But that's precisely what happened". In June 1944, Ivan Šubašić, the Royalist prime minister, and Josip Broz Tito, the Communist Partisan leader, signed an agreement that was an attempt to merge the royal government and communist movement.

On 29 November 1943, AVNOJ (formed by the Partisans) declared themselves the sovereign communist government of Yugoslavia and announced that they would take away all legal rights from the Royal government. On 10 August 1945, less than a month after Alexander's birth, AVNOJ named the country Democratic Federal Yugoslavia. On 29 November 1945, the country was declared a communist republic and changed its name to People's Federal Republic of Yugoslavia.

In 1947, all members of Alexander's family except for his grand-uncle Prince George were deprived of their Yugoslav citizenship and their property was confiscated.

As of 8 July 2015 the High Court in Belgrade found that decree 392, issued by the Presidency of the Presidium of the National Assembly on 3 August 1947, which deprived King Peter II and other members of the House of Karađorđević of their citizenship, was null and void from the moment of its adoption, in the parts pertaining to Crown Prince Alexander, and that all of its legal consequences are thus null and void.

Birth and childhood
Alexander was born in Suite 212 of Claridge's Hotel in Brook Street, Mayfair, London. The British Government is said to have temporarily ceded sovereignty over the suite in which the birth occurred to Yugoslavia so that the crown prince would be born on Yugoslav territory, though the story may be apocryphal, as there exists no documentary record of this. Another part of the story says that a box of soil from the homeland was placed under the bed, so the Prince could be born on Yugoslav soil.

He was the only child of King Peter II and Queen Alexandra of Yugoslavia. He was christened on 24 October 1945 at Westminster Abbey. His godparents were members of the British royal family, King George VI and Princess Elizabeth, who later became Queen Elizabeth II.

His parents were relatively unable to take care of him, due to their various health and financial problems, so Alexander was raised by his maternal grandmother, Princess Aspasia of Greece and Denmark. He was educated at Trinity School, Institut Le Rosey, Culver Military Academy, Gordonstoun, Millfield and Mons Officer Cadet School, Aldershot, and pursued a career in the British military.

Military service
Alexander graduated from the Royal Military Academy Sandhurst in 1966 and was commissioned as an officer into the British Army's 16th/5th The Queen's Royal Lancers regiment, rising to the rank of captain. His tours of duty included West Germany, Italy, the Middle East, and Northern Ireland. After leaving the army in 1972, Alexander, who speaks several languages, pursued a career in international business.

Marriages

On 1 July 1972 at Villamanrique de la Condesa, near Seville, Spain, he married Princess Maria da Gloria of Orléans-Bragança from the Brazilian imperial family. They are double 4th cousins once removed as both are descendants of Prince Ferdinand of Saxe-Coburg and Gotha (1785–1851) and his wife Princess Maria Antonia von Koháry (1797–1862), as well as of Pedro I, Emperor of Brazil and his wife, Archduchess Maria Leopoldina of Austria. They have three sons: Peter (born 5 February 1980), and fraternal twins: Philip and Alexander (both born 15 January 1982).

Alexander and Maria da Gloria divorced on 19 February 1985. Both of them married for the second time. Maria da Gloria married to Ignacio de Medina, Duke of Segorbe (b. 1947), while Crown Prince Alexander married Katherine Clairy Batis, the daughter of Robert Batis and his wife, Anna Dosti, civilly on 20 September 1985, and religiously the following day, at St. Sava Serbian Orthodox Church, Notting Hill, London. Since their marriage, she is known as Crown Princess Katherine, as per the royal family's website.

Return to Yugoslavia

Alexander first came to Yugoslavia in 1991. He actively worked with the opposition to Slobodan Milošević and moved to Yugoslavia after Milošević had been deposed in 2000.

On 27 February 2001, the parliament of the Federal Republic of Yugoslavia (FRY) passed legislation conferring citizenship on members of the Karađorđević family. The legislation may also have effectively annulled a decree stripping the family of its citizenship of the Socialist Federal Republic of Yugoslavia (SFRY) in 1947.

The annulment was the topic of some debate. Notably, the FRY was not the successor of the SFRY; rather the FRY was a new state (and was admitted to the United Nations as a new state on that basis). Therefore, the jurisdiction of a new state to annul an action of a different former state was questioned. In effect, the Karađorđević family had FRY citizenship conferred upon them, not "restored" as such.

The FRY legislation also addresses restoration of property to the Karađorđević family. In March 2001, the property seized from his family, including royal palaces, was returned for residential purposes with property ownership to be decided by parliament at some later date. 

He has lived since 17 July 2001 in the Royal Palace (Kraljevski Dvor) in Dedinje, an exclusive area of Belgrade. The Palace, which was completed in 1929, is one of two royal residences in the Royal Compound; the other is the White Palace, which was completed in 1936.

Belief in constitutional monarchy

Alexander is a proponent of re-creating a constitutional monarchy in Serbia and sees himself as the rightful king. He believes that monarchy could give Serbia "stability, continuity and unity".

A number of political parties and organizations support a constitutional parliamentary monarchy in Serbia. The Serbian Orthodox Church has openly supported the restoration of the monarchy. The assassinated former Serbian Prime Minister Zoran Đinđić was often seen in the company of the prince and his family, supporting their campaigns and projects, although his Democratic Party never publicly embraced monarchy.

Crown Prince Alexander has vowed to stay out of politics. He and Princess Katherine spend considerable time engaging in humanitarian work.

The Crown Prince has, however, increasingly participated in public functions alongside the leaders of Serbia, the former Yugoslav republics and members of the diplomatic corps. On 11 May 2006, he hosted a reception at the Royal Palace for delegates attending a summit on Serbia and Montenegro. The reception was attended by the Governor of the National Bank of Serbia, as well as ambassadors and diplomats from Slovenia, Poland, Brazil, Japan, United States, and Austria. He later delivered a keynote speech in front of prime ministers Vojislav Koštunica and Milo Đukanović. In the speech he spoke of prospective Serbian membership of the European Union. He told delegates:

Following Montenegro's successful independence referendum on 21 May 2006, the re-creation of the Serbian monarchy found its way into daily political debate. A monarchist proposal for the new Serbian constitution has been published alongside other proposals. The document approved in October 2006 is a republican one. The Serbian people have not had a chance to vote on the system of government.

The Crown Prince raised the issue of a royal restoration in the immediate aftermath of the vote. In a press release issued on 24 May 2006 he stated:

In 2011 an online open access poll by Serbian middle-market tabloid newspaper Blic showed that 64% of Serbians support restoring the monarchy. Another poll in May 2013 had 39% of Serbians supporting the monarchy, with 32% against it. The public also had reservations with Alexander's apparent lack of knowledge of the Serbian language. On 27 July 2015, newspaper Blic published a poll "Da li Srbija treba da bude monarhija?" ("Should Serbia be a monarchy?"); 49.8% respondents expressed support in a reconstitution of monarchy, 44.6% were opposed and 5.5% were indifferent.

On 16 December 2017, Alexander attended with his wife the state funeral of his first cousin once removed, King Michael of Romania in Bucharest, along with other heads of European royal families and invited guests.

On 19 September 2022, Alexander and his wife attended the state funeral of his godmother Queen Elizabeth II.

Honours
  House of Karađorđević: Sovereign of the Royal Order of Saint Prince Lazarus
  House of Karađorđević: Sovereign of the Royal Order of Karađorđe's Star
  House of Karađorđević: Sovereign of the Royal Order of the White Eagle
  House of Karađorđević: Sovereign of the Royal Order of the Crown
  House of Karađorđević: Sovereign of the Royal Order of St. Sava
  Brazilian Imperial Family: Knight Grand Cross of the Imperial Order of the Southern Cross
  Italian Royal Family: Knight Grand Cross of the Royal Order of Saints Maurice and Lazarus
  Two Sicilian Royal Family: Knight of the Illustrious Royal Order of Saint Januarius
  Two Sicilian Royal Family: Bailiff Knight Grand Cross of Justice with Collar of the Two Sicilian Royal Sacred Military Constantinian Order of Saint George

Foreign
 : Commander of the National Order of the Legion of Honour
  Sovereign Military Order of Malta: Collar of the Order of Merit
  : Memorial Medal of Tree of Peace, Special class with rubies 
 : Recipient of the 50th Birthday Medal of King Carl XVI Gustaf
 : Recipient of the 70th Birthday Medal of King Carl XVI Gustaf
 : Recipient of the General Service Medal

Ecclesiastical
 Order of Tsar Constantine (Serbian Orthodox Church)
 Order of the Holy Archangels Michael and Gabriel (Greek Orthodox Church)
 Order of Saint Tsar Nicholas (Russian Orthodox Church Outside Russia)
 Order of Saint Sava (First Grade) (Serbian Orthodox Church)
 Order of St. Prince Lazar (Eparchy of Raška and Prizren, Serbian Orthodox Church)

See also 
 Heads of former ruling families

References

Books, letters and articles

Luxmoore, Jonathon,  Serbian Orthodox Leader Calls For Monarchy To Be Reintroduced, Ecumenical News Daily Service (Belgrade), 8 December 2003

External links

Official Royal Family website
Royal Mausoleum Oplenac website
Crown Prince Alexander II Foundation for Education
Crown Princess Katherine's Humanitarian Foundation

Notes 

1945 births
Living people
Yugoslav princes
Heirs apparent who never acceded
Karađorđević dynasty
Pretenders to the Serbian throne
People educated at Gordonstoun
People educated at Millfield
Alumni of Institut Le Rosey
Eastern Orthodox Christians from Serbia
Graduates of the Mons Officer Cadet School
Knights Grand Cross of the Order of the Immaculate Conception of Vila Viçosa
Recipients of the Order pro Merito Melitensi
Serbian people of Greek descent
Serbian people of Danish descent
Yugoslav anti-communists
Serbian anti-communists
Serbian monarchists
Recipients of the Order of the Yugoslav Crown
Culver Academies alumni
Sons of kings